Slovan, meaning "Slav" or Slavic in English, may refer to one of the following sports teams:  

FC Slovan Liberec, Czech football club
HC Slovan Ústečtí Lvi, Czech ice-hockey club
ŠK Slovan Bratislava, Slovak football club
HC Slovan Bratislava, Slovak ice-hockey club
FK Slovan Duslo Šaľa, slovak football club
KD Slovan, Slovenian basketball club
ND Slovan, Slovenian football club
RD Slovan, Slovenian handball club
SK Slovan, Austrian football club

Slovan may also refer to:
Slovan, Pennsylvania, a village in Washington County, Pennsylvania, United States
Slovan, Wisconsin, an unincorporated community, United States